Raymond Vall (born 13 January 1942 in Fleurance) is a member of the Senate of France, representing the Gers department.  He is a member of the Radical Party of the Left.

References
Page on the Senate website

1942 births
Living people
People from Gers
Politicians from Occitania (administrative region)
Radical Party of the Left politicians
Radical Movement politicians
French Senators of the Fifth Republic
Senators of Gers